The Queen Katherine School is an academy school located in Kendal, Cumbria, England. It is a co-educational facility for 11- to 18-year-olds and has around 1,420 students.

The school was judged to be Good in all areas after an inspection by Ofsted in March 2022.

Classification
The school achieved specialist status as a Technology College in 2001 and became a strategic facility for students with physical and medical difficulties in 2002. In 2006, it became a full-service Extended School.

In 2011 the school became an Academy.

In March 2022 the school was judged to be Good in all areas by Ofsted.

Extracurricular activities
There are over 30 school clubs, and a number of activities during lunchtime, after school and at weekends.

There are regular school plays, including an annual musical, a number of choirs and a school orchestra, which perform locally. Many QKS students also play in the Westmorland Youth Orchestra and Cumbria Youth Orchestra, or sing in the Amabile choir.

The School Council
Each form elects representatives who meet as a Year Council. There are Upper and Lower School Councils and a full School Council. Senior Students are elected from the Sixth Form, and they chair the various meetings and organise the Sixth Form Ball, amongst other things. The School Council is given an annual budget to spend on school improvement. The Council is also involved in charity fund-raising.

References

External links
 School website
 School Association (PTA) website
 Ofsted details

Secondary schools in Cumbria
Academies in Cumbria
Kendal